Viswanathan Ravichandran is an Indian film producer and distributor in Chennai, India. He is the founder and owner of the production and distribution company, Aascar Films Pvt. Ltd, previously known as Oscar Films.  Ravichandran started his venture in 1998 with the co-production of Kadhalukku Mariyadhai. He went on to produce many large-scale Tamil language films and distribute a number of English films across South India.

Early life 
He was born in Vellore and completed his graduation from Voorhees College, Vellore. His brothers own smaller production companies, Celebrity Pictures and Viswas Pictures. He started distributing films since he was 16 years old as he was the son of a leading distributor in Vellore.

Career 
Prior to making his name as a film producer, Ravichandran had been a leading film distributor in Tamil cinema since the late 1970s and gained attention through the distribution of Jackie Chan films across Tamil Nadu. Ravichandran made his debut as a producer in cinema through Fazil's romantic drama film Kadhalukku Mariyadhai (1997), which he co-produced with Sangili Murugan. Though Fazil offered him the opportunity to produce the Malayalam version of the film first, Ravichandran refused because he wanted his first venture to be in Tamil. The film went on to become one of the most successful films of the year, while his second venture, Vikraman's family drama Vaanathaippola (2000), received similar commercial success. His third and fourth films, Ezhil's family drama Poovellam Un Vasam (2001) and Sasi's romantic film Roja Koottam (2002), were also highly profitable ventures.

In 2012, Ravichandran and director Shankar began work on the romantic thriller film, I (2015), featuring Vikram in the lead role. En route to becoming one of the most expensive Tamil films of all time, I took three years to complete, with over ten thousand people involved in the making of the film. The team also subsequently held a grand audio launch event with Arnold Schwarzenegger being brought in as chief guest for the event, and I released shortly after, becoming a profitable venture.

In the media 
Ravichandran actively avoids being photographed and prefers to remain incognito at the promotional events of his films. In an interview with Behindwoods.com, he revealed that there were no photographers at his wedding and that in family photos, only his wife would appear with his children.

Filmography

Production

Distribution

References 

Film producers from Chennai
Tamil film producers
Living people
People from Vellore
Year of birth missing (living people)
Producers who won the Best Popular Film Providing Wholesome Entertainment National Film Award
Voorhees College